The 2014–15 Ball State Cardinals men's basketball team represented Ball State University during the 2014–15 NCAA Division I men's basketball season. The Cardinals, led by second year head coach James Whitford, played their home games at John E. Worthen Arena as members of the West Division of the Mid-American Conference. They finished the season 7–23, 2–16 in MAC play to finish in last place in the West Division. They lost in the first round of the MAC tournament to Bowling Green.

Roster

Schedule
Source: 

|-
!colspan=9 style="background:#C41E3A; color:#FFFFFF;"| Regular season
|-

|-
!colspan=9 style="background:#C41E3A; color:#FFFFFF;"| MAC tournament

References

Ball State
Ball State Cardinals men's basketball seasons